Ghalti is a Pakistani television romantic and social Islamic issue drama serial that aired on A-Plus TV from 14 July 2016 to 7 October 2016.  It was directed by Kaleem Rajput and written by Iftikhar Ahmed Usmani. It is a story of two sisters who do not live together and are even unaware of the fact that they are sisters. One of them lives with their parents and the other has been adopted by her aunt. As they grow up, their cousin enters the scene. While the family wants to marry him with the one who lives her parents, he loves the other sister. He marries them both without telling anyone unaware that they are real sisters. Many people are still not aware of limitations in our religion that two sisters can be married the same man at the same time. How certain mistakes in life can outturn the whole scenario. Ghalti has an ensemble cast with Agha Ali as Saim, Saniya Shamshad as Zara Sidra Batool as Saman in leading roles, with the supporting cast Abid Ali as Ikhlaque Ahmed, Sajida Syed, Shehryar Zaidi, Lubna Aslam, and Naila Jaffri, The show is set in Karachi, Sindh. It remained popular throughout its run.

Plot
Ghalti aired on A-Plus TV twice a week. The story revolves around Saim and his cousins, Zara and Sanam. Zara is in love with Saim, whereas, Saim and Sanam are interested in each other. Zara and Sanam are sisters; however, Sanam has always lived with her aunt, unaware of the fact that Zara's mother is also her mother. Only the elders in the family know that Zara and Sanam are sisters and they don't feel that it is important that any of the children know about this. On the other hand, Zara lives at Saim's house with her mother, as Saim's father took them in after Zara's father died.
The story kicks off when one afternoon, Saim's father announces his surprise engagement to Zara, which comes off as a shock to Saim and Sanam. Saim, being a very obedient son, does not object against his father's decision. Later on, when he does discuss it with his father that he does not want to marry Zara, his father announces that they now shall hold his nikkah to Zara the next day. This makes Saim and Sanam take drastic measures and they end up getting their nikkah done at the court the next morning. The same evening, Saim again fails to inform his father and family about his nikkah to Sanam, and therefore, also ends up getting his nikkah done with Zara, which makes him married to both sisters Sanam and Zara at the same time.
The main issue addressed in this drama is how elders and parents fix their children's marriages without their consent. They have instilled their children's minds with fear that they are sometimes unable to voice their opinions. This attitude of the parents forces the children to take extreme measures, which can sometimes result in bigger problems. This drama aims to educate elders against forced marriages and concealing the complete truth from the children, especially in serious matters such as marriage. It also informs youngsters to not only have the guts to voice their opinions in matters that affect their life, but also to avoid extreme measures as the consequences could be awful for everyone.
Agha Ali plays the male lead in the drama along with Sania Shamshad and Sidra Batool as female leads who play Zara and Sanam, respectively. All characters have done a tremendous job at acting. Overall, the way Ghalti has progressed, shows how common and serious this issue is and why it should stop. The only way this can be done is by educating the audience on the severity of the matter and also give solutions to solve them, which this drama has so far successfully addressed.

Cast
 Agha Ali
 Saniya Shamshad as Zara
 Sidra Batool
 Abid Ali
 Sajida Syed
 Shehryar Zaidi
 Lubna Aslam
 Mariam Mirza
 Naila Jaffri
 Hamza Israr

Music

Composer
The title song and background music for the series of Ghalti was composed by musician Wajid Saeed.

Singer
The OST was performed by Bushra Bilal.

Production
 Executive Producer
Naveed Arshad & Musharaf Jaffery
 Producer
Musharaf Jaffery
 Editor
Faiz Ahmed Farooqui
 Dop
Hassam Miraj & Adnan Khalid
 Camera Setup
Single Camera
 Production Head
Muhammad Adil Qureshi
 Production Company
Cine MAtic Media

Release

Broadcast
Ghalti originally aired on A-Plus TV twice a week, on every Tuesday and Friday, starting from its premiere date 14 July 2016, with time slot of 9:00 pm and approximately airs episodes for 36–40 minutes.

Critical reception
Kaleem Rajput’s gripping tale of facing pressure from parents.

See also
 List of Pakistani actresses

References

External links
 Official website
 Ghalti at the Internet Movie Database IMDB
 Ghalti episodes and reviews (Tv Dramas Online)
 Newpaktv.blogspot 
 Vidpk

Pakistani drama television series
2016 Pakistani television series debuts
2016 Pakistani television series endings
Urdu-language television shows
A-Plus TV original programming